Ivrea is a town and comune of the Metropolitan City of Turin in the Piedmont region of northwestern Italy. Situated on the road leading to the Aosta Valley (part of the medieval Via Francigena), it straddles the  Dora Baltea and is regarded as the centre of the Canavese area. Ivrea lies in a basin that in prehistoric times formed a large lake. Today five smaller lakes — Sirio, San Michele, Pistono, Nero and Campagna — are found in the area around the town.

On July 1, 2018, the site which is known as "Industrial City of the 20th Century" was listed as a UNESCO World Heritage Site.

History 

Ivrea and its surroundings have been inhabited since the Neolithic era; the Celts are believed to have had a village in Ivrea from around the 5th century BC. However, the town first officially appears in history as an outpost of the Roman Republic founded in 100 BC, probably built to guard one of the traditional invasion routes into northern Italy over the Alps. Its Latin name was Eporedia.

After the fall of the Western Roman Empire, Ivrea became the seat of a duchy under the Lombards (6th-8th centuries). Under the Franks (9th century), Ivrea was a county capital. In the year 1001, after a period of disputes with bishop Warmund, ruler of the city, Arduin conquered the March of Ivrea. Later he became King of Italy and began a dynasty that lasted until the 11th century, when the city fell again under the bishops' sovereignty.

In the 12th century Ivrea became a free comune, but succumbed in the first decades of the following century to the rule of Emperor Frederick II. Later Ivrea was disputed between the bishops, the marquisate of Monferrato and the House of Savoy.

In 1356 Ivrea was acquired by Amadeus VI of Savoy. With the exception of the brief French conquest at the end of the 16th century, Ivrea remained under the House of Savoy until 1800. It was a subsidiary title of the king of Sardinia, although the only Marquis of Ivrea was Benedetto of Savoy (who later fought in the French Revolutionary wars). On May 26, 1800 Napoleon Bonaparte entered the city along with his victorious troops, establishing control that ended in 1814 after his fall.

During the 20th century its primary claim to fame was as the base of operations for Olivetti, a  manufacturer of typewriters, mechanical calculators and, later, computers. The Olivetti company no longer has an independent existence, though its name still appears as a registered trademark on office equipment manufactured by others.  In 1970 about 90,000 people, including commuters from Southern Italy, lived and worked in the Ivrea Area. 

The Arduino electronic platform was created at the Interaction Design Institute Ivrea, and takes its name from a bar named after the historical figure of Arduin of Italy. UNESCO, when it designated the city a World Heritage Site, said that it "expresses a modern vision of the relationship between industrial production and architecture."

Main sights 

Castle of Ivrea (1357), built during the reign of Amadeus VI of Savoy. It has a quadrangular plan in brick with four round towers at the corners. In 1676, a tower, used as an ammunition store, exploded after being struck by lightning. It was never rebuilt. Once a prison, the castle today houses exhibitions.
Cathedral of Ivrea, which  originated from a church here built in 4th century at the site of a pagan temple. Around 1000 AD, it was reconstructed by bishop Warmondus in Romanesque-style: of that edifice the two bell towers, some columns, and the frescoed crypt remain. The latter houses an ancient Roman sarcophagus which according to tradition, preserves the relics of St. Bessus (co-patron of the city together with St. Sabinus). In 1785, it was rebuilt again in a Baroque style.  The current neo-classical façade was built in the 19th century. One of the old frescoes of the interior is the A Miracle of the Blessed Pierre de Luxembourg (second half of 15th century). The sacristy has two altarpieces by Defendente Ferrari. The cathedral also houses the tomb of Blessed Thaddeus McCarthy.
The Biblioteca Capitolare ("Capitular Library"), near the Cathedral, houses an important collection of codices from the 7th-15th centuries.
Church and convent of San Bernardino: small Gothic church built by the Minorites starting from 1455. It houses a cycle portraying the Life and Passion of Christ by Giovanni Martino Spanzotti (1480–1490).
The Museum Pier Alessandro Garda has some interesting archaeological findings and a collection of Japanese art pieces. It is located on the large Piazza Ottinetti.
The Open Air Museum of Modern Architecture, inaugurated in 2001, is a show of the main edifices (some by leading architects of the time) built by Olivetti from the 1950s onwards.
It could hold 10,000 spectators.
The Ponte Vecchio (Old Bridge) dates back to AD 100 and leads over to Borghetto. Originally constructed of wood, it was rebuilt in stone in 1716.
The Town Hall (Palazzo di Città), built in 1758. It has a  bell tower decorated with hemp plants, the symbol of Canavese.
St. Stephen Tower, dating from the 11th century. This Romanesque bell tower is the remains of St. Stephen Abbey, built in 1041 by the Benedictine order. It is located between Hotel La Serra and Dora Baltea.
Church of San Gaudenzio
Santa Marta (late 15th-century), former church
Cappella dei Tre Re

Culture 

There are two main festivals in Ivrea, both celebrated during Catholic festivity but both rooted in more ancient city's traditions. One is the Carnival, its main celebrations taking place 40 days before Easter. The other is the patronal festival of St. Savino (Sabinus of Spoleto), celebrated the week of July 7. During the latter festivity, a horse fair takes place with a carriage exhibition and horse shows.

Battle of the Oranges 

The core celebration of Ivrea carnival centres around the Battle of the Oranges. This involves some thousands of townspeople, divided into nine combat on-the-ground teams, who throw oranges at tens of cart-based teams  — with considerable violence — during the last three fat carnival days: Sunday, Monday and Tuesday. The carnival takes place 40 days before Easter and it ends on the night of "Fat Tuesday" with a solemn ceremony that involves a funeral in honour of the concluded Carnival.

A Mugnaia is chosen among the citizens spouses. The legend has that a miller's daughter (the eponymous "Mugnaia") once refused to accept the "right" of the local duke to spend a night with each newly wed woman and chopped his head off. Today the carriages represent the duke's guard and the orange throwers the revolutionaries. People wearing a red hat will not be considered part of the revolutionaries, and therefore will not have oranges thrown at them.

The origin of the tradition to throw oranges is not well understood, particularly as oranges do not grow in the foothills of the Italian Alps and must be transported from Sicily.

Sport 

The town's football club, A.S.D. Montalto Ivrea, currently plays in Promozione Piemonte.

The Ivrea Rugby Club plays in C1 Piemontese.

Ivrea has been an host for the 2016 and 2017 Canoe Slalom World Cup.

Twin towns 
Ivrea is twinned with:
 Rădăuți, Romania
 Monthey, Switzerland
 Lüneburg, Germany

References

External links 

 
 Carnival of Ivrea
 Official Website of Modern Architecture of Ivrea
 Pictures of Ivrea
 Pictures of the Carnival and the Battle of the oranges
 U.N.I.T.A.L.S.I. Ivrea

 
Canavese
Roman towns and cities in Italy
World Heritage Sites in Italy
Cities and towns in Piedmont
Former republics